Dirk Van Tichelt (born 10 June 1984) is a Belgian judoka.

His biggest achievement was his European title in Lisbon. In the same year, at the Beijing Olympics he came fifth after losing in the first round to gold-medallist Elnur Mammadli and later losing in the bronze medal match to Rasul Boqiev. At the 2009 World Championships, he reached the semi-finals but there he lost to Kim Chol-Su.  In the bronze medal match he beat Sezer Huysuz to take his first bronze medal at a world championships.  At the 2013 World Championships, he again won bronze, losing to eventual champion Shohei Ono in the semi-final and beating Dastan Ykybayev in his bronze medal match.

In the 2016 Summer Olympics, Van Tichelt won the bronze medal against Miklos Ungvari.

Van Tichelt went to university at Vrije Universiteit Brussel (VUB).

Achievements

References

External links
 
 
 
 

Belgian male judoka
Judoka at the 2008 Summer Olympics
Judoka at the 2012 Summer Olympics
Judoka at the 2016 Summer Olympics
Olympic bronze medalists for Belgium
Olympic judoka of Belgium
Olympic medalists in judo
1984 births
Living people
Judoka at the 2015 European Games
European Games medalists in judo
European Games bronze medalists for Belgium
Medalists at the 2016 Summer Olympics
20th-century Belgian people
21st-century Belgian people